Chimerin 1 (CHN1), also known as alpha-1-chimerin, n-chimerin, is a protein which in humans is encoded by the CHN1 gene.

Chimerin 1 is a GTPase activating protein specific for RAC GTP-binding proteins. It is expressed primarily in the brain and may be involved in signal transduction.

This gene encodes GTPase-activating protein for p21-rac and a phorbol ester receptor. It plays an important role in ocular motor axon pathfinding.

Function 
CHN1 is a three-domain protein with the N-terminal SH2 domain, the C-terminal RhoGAP domain and the central C1 domain similar to protein kinase C. When lipid diacylglycerol (DAG) binds to the C1 domain, CHN1 is transferred to the plasma membrane and negatively regulates Rho-family small GTPases RAC1 and CDC42, thus causing the morphological change of axons by pruning the ends of axon dendrites.

Mutational analysis suggests that un-overlapping residues of the RhoGAP domain are involved in RAC1-binding and the RAC1-GAP activity. Regulation of the RhoGAP activity of CHN1 by phorbol esters, natural compounds mimic of the lipid second messenger DAG, presents a possible way of designing agents for therapeutics.

Clinical significance 
Heterozygous missense mutations in this gene cause Duane's retraction syndrome 2 (DURS2).

References

External links
 GeneReviews/NCBI/NIH/UW entry on Duane syndrome
 

GTP-binding protein regulators
Proteins